Altza is a railway station in San Sebastián, Basque Country, Spain. It is owned by Euskal Trenbide Sarea and operated by Euskotren. It lies on a branch of the San Sebastián-Hendaye railway, popularly known as Topo.

History 
The station opened in September 2016, together with the tunnel that connects it with Herrera. As the opening happened during a strike, the official inauguration took place a month later on 9 October.

Works on the extension to Galtzaraborda, which will give the station continuity eastwards, started in early 2022.

Services 
The station is served by Euskotren Trena line E5. It runs every 15 minutes on weekdays and weekend afternoons, and every 30 minutes on weekend mornings.

References

External links
 

Euskotren Trena stations
Railway stations in San Sebastián
Railway stations in Spain opened in 2016
2016 establishments in the Basque Country (autonomous community)